Toses is a small village in the county of Ripollès in the province of Girona and autonomous community of Catalonia, Spain. It is furthermore the name of the municipality of Toses which, in addition to the village of Toses, comprises the villages of Fornells, Dòrria and Nevà.

The R3 railway service from Barcelona to the French border has a stop in the village.

References

External links
 Government data pages 

Municipalities in Ripollès